The Malaita tube-nosed fruit bat (Nyctimene malaitensis) is a species of bat in the family Pteropodidae. It is endemic only to the islands of Malaita and Makira (formerly known as San Cristóbal) in the Solomon Islands. The species occurs in primary tropical moist forest.

References

Nyctimene (genus)
Bats of Oceania
Endemic fauna of the Solomon Islands
Mammals of the Solomon Islands
Mammals described in 1968
Taxonomy articles created by Polbot